Funk Wav Bounces Vol. 2 is the sixth studio album by Scottish DJ and record producer Calvin Harris. It was released on 5 August 2022 through Columbia Records. The album contains guest appearances from 21 Savage, Dua Lipa, Young Thug, Stefflon Don, Chloë, Coi Leray, Charlie Puth, Shenseea, Normani, Tinashe, Offset, Busta Rhymes, Justin Timberlake, Halsey, Pharrell Williams, Jorja Smith, Lil Durk, 6lack, Donae'o, Snoop Dogg, Latto, Swae Lee, and Pusha T. It serves as a sequel to his previous album, Funk Wav Bounces Vol. 1 (2017).

Background and release
Funk Wav Bounces Vol. 1 was released in June 2017. Volume 2 marks Harris's first album in five years. The album includes 23 collaborators.

In March 2022, Harris seemingly confirmed on Twitter that there would be a sequel to his 2017 studio album Funk Wav Bounces Vol. 1 by writing "Vol. 2 is gonna be mad". On 20 April 2022, he officially announced that the album would be released in the summer via his social media accounts. The announcement featured a photo of a billboard with the album's title on it located near Indio, California. On 23 May 2022, Harris posted a teaser via his social media accounts with the caption "Friday". The teaser contained a snippet of a new song along with an accompanying video that shows an island with purple-tinted water, palm trees, and a pink-hued sky. On 30 June 2022, the release date for Funk Wav Bounces Vol. 2 was revealed as 5 August 2022, alongside a video trailer revealing the artists making guest appearances on the album.

Singles
The album's lead single, "Potion", a collaboration with English singer Dua Lipa and American rapper Young Thug, was released on 27 May 2022. It was first teased by Harris on 24 May through the social media application TikTok. "Potion" is Lipa's second collaboration with Harris following "One Kiss", which was released in 2018. A music video was released for the song which features Lipa in four vintage outfits. The album's second single, "New Money", a collaboration with Atlanta-based rapper 21 Savage, was released on 1 July 2022. The album's third single, "Stay with Me", a collaboration with American singer-songwriters Justin Timberlake, Halsey, and Pharrell Williams, was released on 15 July 2022. It was teased by Harris on 6 July 2022. A fourth single, "New to You", with Normani, Tinashe and Offset was released on 29 July 2022. Obsessed was released as the fifth single in UK Radio. All singles were solely produced by Harris.

Critical reception

On review aggregator Metacritic, Funk Wav Bounces Vol. 2 received a score of 60 based on 12 critics' reviews, indicating "mixed or average reviews". Hannah Mylrea of NME wrote that on the album, Harris "meshes a wistful grab-bag of influences – nu-disco, funk, boogie, soul – with his skill for creating a mega-watt pop-hit, taking listeners on a journey on a psychedelic trip you won't want to end". Maura Johnston of Rolling Stone opined that Harris is not "reinventing the dance-pop wheel with Funk Wav Bounces Vol. 2—the title alone shows that. But it's a fine wind-down album, one that can be put on shuffle at the end of a long-summer-night bacchanal".

James Hall of The Telegraph described the record as a "hazy collection of groove-driven vocal tracks" that "comes across as even more laid-back than its predecessor". Reviewing the album for The Guardian, Alim Kheraj characterised the album as "slinky disco-pop" but felt that Harris's "luxurious production doesn't disguise the dullness of the songs". Writing for Pitchfork, Owen Myers found when Harris "borrows from disco, electro-soul, boogie, and '80s R&B, the music is so wispy and unobtrusive it has the staying power of vape smoke at Coachella", elaborating that his "synths glide frictionlessly" and "vivid colors become pastel-toned playlist fodder".

Track listing
All tracks produced solely by Calvin Harris, except for "Ready or Not", produced alongside Burns.

Personnel
Musicians

6lack – vocals (11)
21 Savage – vocals (2)
Alissa Benveniste – bass (2)
Jesse Boykins III – background vocals (13)
Charlie Brown – violin (6, 8–9)
Ian Burdge (1st) – cello (6, 8–9)
Busta Rhymes – vocals (7)
Emil Chakalov – violin (6, 8–9)
Reiad Chibah – viola (6)
Chlöe – vocals (4)
Coi Leray – vocals (4)
Nick Cooper – cello (6, 8–9)
Donae'o – vocals (11)
Dua Lipa – vocals (3)
Richard George (Leader of the 2nds) – violin (6, 8–9)
Sara Hajir – cello (6, 8–9)
Halsey – vocals (8–9)
Calvin Harris – producer (all)
Marianne Haynes – violin (6, 8–9)
Ian Humphries – violin (6, 8–9)
Charis Jenson – violin (6, 8–9)
Patrick Kiernan – violin (6, 8–9)
Latto – vocals (12)
Lil Durk – vocals (10)
John Mills – violin (6, 8–9)
Perry Montague-Mason – violin (6, 8–9)
Everton Nelson (leader) – violin (6, 8–9)
Normani – vocals (6)
Offset – vocals (6)
Andy Parker – viola (6)
Tim Pigott-Smith – violin (6, 8–9)
Haley Pomfrett – violin (6, 8–9)
Pusha T – vocals (14)
Charlie Puth – vocals (5)
Shenseea – vocals (5)
Adrian Smith – viola (6)
Jorja Smith – vocals (10)
Stefflon Don – vocals (4)
Snoop Dogg – vocals (12)
Swae Lee – vocals (13)
Justin Timberlake – vocals (8–9)
Tinashe – vocals (6)
Bruce White (1st) – viola (6)
Lucy Wilkins – violin (6, 8–9)
Pharrell Williams – vocals (8–9, 14)
Chris Worsley – cello (6, 8–9)
Young Thug – vocals (3)
Warren Zielinski – violin (6, 8–9)

Technical

Chloe Bailey – vocal producer (4)
Bainz – miscellaneous production (3), recording engineer (3), vocal producer (3)
Durk "Lil Durk" Banks  – vocal producer (10)
Jesse Boykins III – vocal producer (5)
Burns – producer (7)
Busta Rhymes – vocal producer (7)
Brandon Buttner – engineer (8–9), miscellaneous production (8–9), recording engineer (8–9)
Jelli Dorman – vocal engineer (6)
Dre Z – recording engineer (4)
Arin "Ajstayworkin" Fields – recording engineer (3)
Steven Fitzmaurice – engineer (6, 8–9), recording engineer (6, 8–9)
Jared "JT" Gagarin – recording engineer (11)
Justin "Jusvibes" Gibson – recording engineer
Chris Godbey – recording engineer (8–9)
Mark "Exit" Goodchild – recording engineer (5), miscellaneous production (6–10, 12, 14)
Kuk Harrell – vocal engineer (6), vocal producer (6), recording engineer (6)
Calvin Harris – mixing engineer (1–7, 10–14), recording engineer (1, 3–6, 8–10), vocal producer (3–4, 6, 8–11)
Tom Hough – recording engineer (11)
JRich ENT – recording engineer (6)
Dave Kutch – mastering engineer (all)
Randy Lanphear – recording engineer (13)
Mike Larson – recording engineer (8–9, 14)
Damien Lewis – recording engineer (8–9)
Delanie Leyden – recording engineer (7)
Emma Marks – miscellaneous production (6, 8–9)
Manny Marroquin – mixing engineer (8–9)
Edith Nelson – recording engineer (10)
Zach Pereya – assistant engineer (8–9)
Adele Phillips – miscellaneous production (6, 8–9)
Pusha T – vocal producer (14)
Charlie Puth – recording engineer (5), vocal producer (5)
Snoop Dogg – vocal producer (12)
Trey Station – assistant engineer (8–9)
Justin Timberlake – vocal producer (8–9)
Marcos Tovar – recording engineer (2)
Rob Ulsh – recording engineer
Javier Valverde – recording engineer (12) 
Frank Vasquez – recording engineer (12)
Anthony Vilchis – assistant engineer (8–9)
Pharrell Williams – vocal producer (8–9, 14)
Terrance Wilson – engineer (4, 8–9)

Charts

References

2022 albums
Calvin Harris albums
Columbia Records albums
Albums produced by Calvin Harris
Sequel albums
Pop albums by British artists
Nu-disco albums
Electronic dance music albums by British artists
Albums produced by Burns (musician)
Albums produced by Pharrell Williams
Albums produced by Justin Timberlake
Albums produced by Kuk Harrell